Lapalapa Toni (born 7 April 1994) is a Samoan footballer who plays as a forward for Lupe o le Soaga and the Samoa national football team.

Career
In 2017 Toni was the topscorer of the Samoan league.  He was part of the Lupe o le Soaga squads for the 2014-15, 2017, and 2018 OFC Champions Leagues. In 2019 he played for the Havelock North Wanderers while living in New Zealand. In 2020 he returned to Lupe o le Soaga for the 2020 OFC Champions League.

He made his debut for the Samoa national football team on August 31, 2015 in a 3–2 victory against American Samoa. He was selected for the team for the 2016 OFC Nations Cup. In June 2019 he was named to the squad for the 2019 Pacific Games.

References

External links
 

Living people
1994 births
Samoan footballers
Kiwi FC players
Samoa international footballers
Association football forwards
2016 OFC Nations Cup players